The following is a list of awards and nominations received by American actor and producer Robert Downey Jr. throughout his career.


Awards and nominations

References

Notes

Sources

Downey Jr., Robert